Sankara Subrahmanya Iyer popularly known as Subbayyan or  Subbayyan Dalawa was the Dewan of erstwhile Travancore Kingdom (now part of India) during 1763 and 1768 and was responsible for the expansion of the kingdom by annexing Parur and Alangad kingdoms.
Sree Viswanatha Swamy temple, in Varkala, 1 km from both Kedavathuvila and Dalawapuram junctions, behind the present NES Block Office is historically associated with Subbayyan. The family quarters of the head priest of the temple is believed to be the birth place of Subbayyan Dalawa.

See also
 Dewan
 Travancore
 PGN Unnithan
 Marthandavarma (novel)

References

 Travancore State Manual by V.Nagam Aiya (1906)
 History of Travancore by Shungunny Menon

Malayali people
Diwans of Travancore